One More Time For Peace is a studio album by singer Roger Chapman. The album was released 2007.

Track listing
 "One More Time for Peace!" (Roger Chapman) – 4:05
 "Heading Back to Storyville" (Chapman) – 6:22
 "All Too Soon" (Chapman) – 5:07
 "Oh Brother, Take Me!" (Chapman, Steve Simpson) – 6:00
 "Hell of a Lullaby" (Chapman) – 4:59
 "All Night Paradise" (Chapman) – 3:35
 "Naked Hearts" (Chapman, Jim Cregan) – 3:47
 "Sweet Bird" (Chapman) – 3:48
 "Devil Got a Son" (Chapman) – 4:38
 "The Same Old Loving Feeling" (Chapman, Simpson) – 4:14
 "Jerusalem" (Trad. arranged by Chapman & Cregan) – 3:14

Personnel
 Roger Chapman – vocals
 Jim Cregan – Producer, electric and acoustic guitars, background vocals, programming
 Steve Simpson – electric, slide & acoustic guitars, mandolin, fiddle, background vocals
 Micky Moody – electric, slide, acoustic & dobro guitars
 Ian Gibbons – organ
 Henry Spinetti – drums
 Tim Harries – bass
 Max Middleton – piano
 Sonny Spider – harmonica and background vocals
 Roger Cotton – organ at "One More Time For Peace"
 Bobby Tench – backing vocals

References 

Roger Chapman albums
2007 albums